The women's modern pentathlon at the 2004 Summer Olympics took place at the Olympic Modern Pentathlon Centre in Goudi Olympic Complex on 27 August. On its second appearance at the Olympics, thirty-two athletes from 21 nations participated in this event.

Zsuzsanna Vörös of Hungary emerged as the top favorite in the women's event, and won the gold medal, with a score of 5,448 points. Meanwhile, Jeļena Rubļevska set a historic milestone as the first female Latvian to win an Olympic medal, taking the silver in this event. Great Britain's Georgina Harland claimed the nation's second Olympic bronze medal, and third overall for the women's.

Competition format
The modern pentathlon consisted of five events, with all five held in one day.

 Shooting: A 4.5 mm air pistol shooting (the athlete must hit 20 shots, one at each target). Score was based on the number of shots hitting at each target.
 Fencing: A round-robin, one-touch épée competition. Score was based on winning percentage.
 Swimming: A 200 m freestyle race. Score was based on time.
 Horse-riding: A show jumping competition. Score based on penalties for fallen bars, refusals, falls, and being over the time limit.
 Running: A 3 km run.  Starts are staggered (based on points from first four events), so that the first to cross the finish line wins.

Schedule
All times are Greece Standard Time (UTC+2)

Results

* Did not finish the riding course because of the exceeding number of obstacle and time penalties

References

External links
BBC Sport – 2004 Athens
Official Olympic Report
Official Results

Women's
2004 in women's sport
Women's events at the 2004 Summer Olympics